ATVI may refer to:

 Activision Blizzard
 Afghanistan Technical Vocational Institute